Massimo Bartolini (born 1962 in Cecina) is an Italian artist. Bartolini works are mainly installations, but also creates video and photographs.

Selected works
 Organi (2008) 
 An Outdoor Library (2012)

References

External links
 List of exhibitions
 documenta13 listing

Italian contemporary artists
1962 births
Living people